Endurance Ofem (born 16 July 1982) is a Nigerian cricketer. He played in the 2013 ICC World Cricket League Division Six tournament.

References

External links
 

1982 births
Living people
Nigerian cricketers
Place of birth missing (living people)